Bruno Lutz (7 June 1889 – 5 March 1964) was a German art director.

Selected filmography
 The Transformation of Dr. Bessel (1927)
 The Lady in Black (1928)
 The Beaver Coat (1928)
 Two Good Comrades (1933)
 Bashful Felix (1934)
 The Big Chance (1934)
 The Champion of Pontresina (1934)
 The Riders of German East Africa (1934)
 D III 88 (1939)
 Alarm (1941)
 Beloved Darling (1943)
 When the Young Wine Blossoms (1943)
 A Man Like Maximilian (1945)
 In the Temple of Venus (1948)
 Stars Over Colombo (1954)
 The Maharajah's Blonde (1962)

References

Bibliography
 Bernadette Kester. Film Front Weimar: Representations of the First World War in German Films of the Weimar Period. Amsterdam University Press, 2003.

External links

1889 births
1964 deaths
German art directors
Film people from Berlin